Weustenrade is a hamlet in the municipality of Voerendaal of the province Limburg, Netherlands. It is located near Hoensbroek, Voerendaal and Klimmen. 

The village was first mentioned in 1420 as Woestenroede, and means "desolate cultivated forest". It was home to 105 people in 1840.

There are still several old seventeenth-century houses, among which the 'oliemolen' (oilmill).

References 

Populated places in Limburg (Netherlands)
Voerendaal